Isabel Judd (18 October 1886 – 1 June 1951) was a British gymnast. She won a bronze medal in the women's team event at the 1928 Summer Olympics.

References

1886 births
1951 deaths
British female artistic gymnasts
Olympic gymnasts of Great Britain
Gymnasts at the 1928 Summer Olympics
Olympic bronze medallists for Great Britain
Olympic medalists in gymnastics
Medalists at the 1928 Summer Olympics
People from West Ham
Sportspeople from London